Rui Monteiro may refer to:
Rui Monteiro (footballer, born 1977), Cape Verdean footballer
Rui Monteiro (footballer, born 1991), Portuguese footballer